The 2019–20 Mestis season was the 20th season of Mestis, the second highest level of ice hockey in Finland after Liiga. LeKi lost their Mestis place due to financial difficulties and due to that Hokki was promoted to Mestis for this season. The playoffs and relegations were cancelled due to the COVID-19 pandemic.

Clubs

Regular season

Rules for classification: 1) Points; 2) Goal difference; 3) Goals scored; 4) Head-to-head points; 5) Penalty minutes.

See also
 2019–20 Liiga season

References

Mestis seasons
Mestis
Mestis
Finland
Mestis season